The 2017 Oceania Weightlifting Championships were held in Gold Coast, Australia between 4 and 9 September 2017. The competition was part of the Commonwealth Championships – the test event for the 2018 Commonwealth Games weightlifting competition.

Medal summary
Results shown below are for the senior competition only. Junior and youth results are cited here and here respectively.

Men

Women

Medal table 
Ranking by Big (Total result) medals

References

External links
 Senior results book
 Junior results book
 Youth results book

Oceania Weightlifting Championships
Oceania Weightlifting Championships
International weightlifting competitions hosted by Australia
Sports competitions on the Gold Coast, Queensland
Oceania Weightlifting Championships